The Hundred Flowers Award for Best Original Score was first awarded by the China Film Association in 1962.

1980s

1960s

References

Original Score